Karl Mööl (born 4 March 1992) is an Estonian professional footballer who plays as a right back for Estonian club Paide Linnameeskond and the Estonia national team.

Club career

Flora
Mööl first played for a local club Kotkad, and joined the Flora youth academy in 2008. He made his debut in the Meistriliiga on 11 July 2009, in a 2–1 home victory over Tammeka. In July 2010, Mööl moved to Tulevik on loan until the end of the 2010 season. In 2011, he joined Viljandi on a season-long loan. Mööl scored his first Meistriliiga goal on 4 June 2011, in a 2–0 away victory over Kuressaare.

Mööl scored his first goal for Flora on 6 March 2012, in an Estonian Supercup match against Narva Trans, winning the game 4–0. On 18 May 2013, he won the Estonian Cup.

On 28 June 2013, Mööl joined Kuressaare on loan until the end of the season.

Nõmme Kalju
On 24 February 2014, Mööl signed a three-year contract with Meistriliiga club Nõmme Kalju. 30 May 2015, he won his second Estonian Cup as Nõmme Kalju beat Paide Linnameeskond 2–0 in the final.

HB Køge
On 22 February 2018, Mööl signed for Danish club HB Køge.

Tallinna Kalev
On 2 July 2018, Mööl joined Meistriliiga club Tallinna Kalev.

Paide Linnameeskond
On 5 December 2018, Mööl signed a two-year contract with Paide Linnameeskond.

International career
Mööl began his international career for Estonia with the national under-16 team in 2007, and went on to represent the under-17, under-18, under-19, under-21, and under-23 national sides.

On 1 November 2012, Mööl was named by manager Tarmo Rüütli in the Estonia squad to face Oman in a friendly on 8 November 2012, and made his senior international debut in the 2–1 away victory.

Honours

Club
Flora
Estonian Cup: 2012–13
Estonian Supercup: 2012

Nõmme Kalju
Estonian Cup: 2014–15

References

External links

1992 births
Living people
Estonian footballers
Footballers from Tallinn
Association football defenders
Esiliiga players
FC Warrior Valga players
Meistriliiga players
FC Flora players
Viljandi JK Tulevik players
FC Viljandi players
FC Kuressaare players
Nõmme Kalju FC players
JK Tallinna Kalev players
Paide Linnameeskond players
Danish 1st Division players
HB Køge players
Estonia youth international footballers
Estonia under-21 international footballers
Estonia international footballers
Estonian expatriate footballers
Estonian expatriate sportspeople in Denmark
Expatriate men's footballers in Denmark